Peruvian Spanish is a family of  dialects of the Spanish language that have been spoken in Peru since brought over by Spanish conquistadors in 1492. There are four varieties spoken in the country, by about 94.4% of the population. The four Peruvian dialects are Andean Spanish, Peruvian Coastal Spanish, Andean-Coastal Spanish, and Amazonic Spanish.

History
The Spanish language first arrived in  Peru in 1532. During colonial and early republican times, the Spanish spoken colloquially in the coast and in the cities of the highland possessed strong local features, but as a result of dialect leveling in favor of the standard language, the language of urban Peruvians today is more or less uniform in pronunciation throughout most of the country. Vestiges of the older dialect of the coast can be found in the speech of  black Peruvians, which retains Andalusian features such as the aspiration or deletion of final /s/ and the deletion of final /r/. The dialect of Arequipa, Loncco, in its pure form is now extinct, although some elders are familiar with it.

Throughout most of the highland, Quechua continued to be the language of the majority until the mid 20th century. Mass migration (rural exodus) into Lima starting in the 1940s, and into other major cities  and regional capitals later on, accompanied by discrimination and the growth of mass media, have reconfigured the linguistic demography of the country in favor of Spanish. The poor urban masses originating in this migration adopted the standardized dialect spoken in the cities, however with traces of Andean pronunciation and a simplified syntax.

Peruvian dialects

Andean Spanish

Andean Spanish the most common dialect in the Andes (more marked in rural areas) and has many similarities with the "standard" dialect of Ecuador and Bolivia.

Characteristics 
Phonology

(In reality, they are producing a sound between /e/ and /i/, and between /o/ and /u/.) Furthermore, the "s" (originally apical and without aspiration) is produced with more force than that of the coast; this is also generally true of the other consonants, at the loss of the vowels. Also, the intonation patterns of some Andean accents, such as that of Cusco, is influenced by Quechua intonation.

The morphosyntactic characteristics are typical:

Confusion or unification of gender and number
A ellas lo recibí bien.. La revista es caro.

Confusion or unification of gender and number
esa es su trenza del carlos.

Frequent use of the diminutives –ito and –ita
Vente aquicito.. Sí, señorita, ahí están sus hijos.

Loísmo
Lo echan la agua. Lo pintan la casa

Duplication of the possessives and objects
Su casa de Pepe.. Lo conozco a ella.

The absence or redundant use of articles
Plaza de Armas es acá. La María está loca.

Uncommon use of the preposition "en" in front of locative adverbs
Todo caerá en su encima

 The use of "no más" and "pues" after the verb
Dile nomás pues.

 The use of the verb at the end of the phrase
Está enojada dice.

The use of the simple tense to express the preterite and of the indicative in place of the subjunctive in subordinates.

Peruvian Coastal Spanish

Coastal Spanish is spoken throughout the coast. It is the characteristic dialect as perceived abroad and has the reputation of being the base of "normal" or standard Peruvian Spanish.

Characteristics

Phonology
The vowels are stable and clear.
Word-final nasals are velar (not alveolar like in Mexico or central Spain).
 The tendency to eliminate hiatus in word with an -ear suffix.

General Spanish phrases from the Americas are common but there are also phrases that originate in the Lima coastal area, such as frequent traditional terms and expressions; the most ingrained "quechuaism" in common speech is the familiar calato, meaning "naked".

Syntax

Andean-Coastal Spanish  

Originated in the last 30 to 50 years with a mixture of the speech of Andean migrants and the speech of Lima. This dialect is the speech that is most typical in the upskirts of the city, but also serves as a transitional dialect between Coastal and Andean Spanish spoken in between the coast and the highlands.

Characteristics
Phonology

This dialect has the usual Andean syntactics, like lack of agreement in gender and number, the frequent use of diminutives or augmentatives, loísmo, double possessives and ending phrases with "pues", "pe" or "pue".

As far as the lexicon is concerned, there are numerous neologisms, influences from Quechua, and slang among the youth often heard in the streets.

Amazonic Spanish 

This dialect has developed uniquely, with contact from Andean Spanish and the Spanish of Lima with the Amazonian languages.  It has a distinctive tonal structure.

Phonetically it is characterized by:
The sibilant  resisting aspiration
For example, San Juan becomes San Fan
 There is occlusion of the intervals  in tonal ascension with aspiration and lengthening of the vowels.
 are pronounced with aspiration
The  tends to become an affricate (as opposed to Peruvian Coastal Spanish)
Also, there is assibilation and weak trills.

On the other hand, the syntactic order most recognized is the prefixation of the genitive:
De Antonio sus amigas

There are also disorders of agreement, gender, etc.

Equatorial Spanish 

This dialect is spoken in the region of Tumbes.

References

Spanish dialects of South America
Spanish
Spanish Peruvian